Medvedkovo may refer to:
Medvedkovo (Moscow Metro), a station of the Moscow Metro, Moscow, Russia
Medvedkovo (rural locality), several rural localities in Russia

See also
Severnoye Medvedkovo District, a district of Moscow, Russia
Yuzhnoye Medvedkovo District, a district of Moscow, Russia